Stu Segall Productions is a  studio facility located in San Diego, California.

Filmings

The studio is used primarily for filming television series and movies in the San Diego area.  Television shows shot in the studio or on location in San Diego include Veronica Mars, Silk Stalkings, Pensacola: Wings of Gold, Renegade, Push and all six MyNetworkTV limited-run serials. Feature films include Flying By, Hairy Tale, Raven, Fast Money, Illegal in Blue, and Dead On. Television films include The Dark, Surrender Dorothy, See Arnold Run, Tiger Cruise, and I Married a Monster.

The studio was built in 1991 and is sometimes referred to as Stu Segall Studios.  Part of the facility is used for police and military training exercises under the operating name of Strategic Operations or STOPS.  In addition, a satellite facility is located in North Hollywood, Los Angeles.

References

External links 
 Official site
 Modest mogul: 
 KNSD: Marine Sues Local Studio Over Injury: Incident Occurred During Filming At Miramar
 KGTV: Marine suing producer of training exercise

Television studios in the United States
Companies based in San Diego
Privately held companies based in California
1991 establishments in California
American companies established in 1991
Television production companies of the United States